Started in 2008, ChloroFilms was organized as an international competition to promote the creation and use of attention-getting videos about the life and inner workings of plants and their unique abilities. The short videos are hosted on YouTube and assessed by a panel of judges from around the world.  With funding and support from three plant biology organizations, ChloroFilms awarded over $13,000 in cash prizes in 2009 and 2010. The grand prize winner in 2009 was a 6-min video entitled "Fertile Eyes" which graphically and humorously compares human and plant sexuality in a captivating way. A first prize went to Kris Holmes for her flower-power animation "LaBloomba". Grand prize winners in 2010 include "Arabidopsis flower in 3D", which takes the viewer inside a plant and a flower bud using thin (microscopic) sections combined with video processing software, and "Kenaf Callus Hoedown", which uses lively fiddle music and stop motion film techniques to show the steps used in plant tissue culture. Other award-winning videos include a humorous animation of vesicle trafficking inside cells, the ecology of forests, a song about the Golgi apparatus, and more than 40 additional videos from around the world, illustrating aspects of plant life.  A fourth contest is scheduled for fall 2010.

Sponsors of ChloroFilms include the Education Foundation of the American Society of Plant Biologists, the Botanical Society of America, the Canadian Botanical Association, and Penn State University Institutes for Energy and the Environment.

References

Science competitions